Thomas Rolston (born October 31, 1932 in Vancouver, British Columbia - died May 29, 2010 in Vancouver, British Columbia) was a Canadian violinist and conductor.

After early studies with Douglas Stewart, Roman Totenberg and David Martin, Rolston was a member of the Philharmonia Orchestra (1951–1958).  He was concertmaster and (1958–1960) and Associate Conductor (1960–1964) of the Edmonton Symphony Orchestra.  He taught at the University of Alberta in Edmonton until 1979, when he became the first director of music at the Banff Centre for the Arts and where he was head of the string department as well as both the Centre's music co-ordinator and music director, overseeing the Centre's summer programs until his retirement in 2004.  He created the Canadian Chamber Orchestra, introduced the Suzuki method of violin instruction to Canada, and founded the Society for Talent Education in 1964.  Between 1988 and 1991, he taught at the University of Calgary.

References

1932 births
2010 deaths
Male conductors (music)
Canadian classical violinists
Male classical violinists
Musicians from Vancouver
20th-century classical violinists
20th-century Canadian conductors (music)
20th-century Canadian male musicians
20th-century Canadian violinists and fiddlers
Canadian male violinists and fiddlers